Nueve de Julio  is a department of Chaco Province in Argentina.

The provincial subdivision has a population of about 27,000 inhabitants in an area of  1,130 km2, and its capital city is Las Breñas, which is located around 1,130 km from the Capital federal.

Settlements
Colonia Santa Elena
El Puca
Las Breñas
Pampa del Cielo
Pampa San Martin
Pampa Sommer
Pozo del Indio

References

Departments of Chaco Province